The article lists all the 86 parganas in the 13 districts of Uttarakhand.

District-wise details

See also
 Administrative divisions of Uttarakhand
 List of districts of Uttarakhand
 List of tehsils of Uttarakhand
 List of community development blocks of Uttarakhand

References
 
 

Parganas